Gerald Johnston (21 June 1891 – 30 December 1968) was an Australian rules footballer who played with University in the Victorian Football League (VFL).

Sources
Holmesby, Russell & Main, Jim (2007). The Encyclopedia of AFL Footballers. 7th ed. Melbourne: Bas Publishing.

1891 births
1968 deaths
University Football Club players
Australian players of Australian rules football